FILMFEST HAMBURG is an international film festival in Hamburg, the third-largest of its kind in Germany (after Berlin and Munich). It shows national and international feature and documentary films in eleven sections. The range of the program stretches from art house films to innovative mainstream cinema, presenting the first feature films of young unknown directors together with films by internationally established directors. In 2017 more than 40,000 people attended 250 screenings of 141 films.

Albert Wiederspiel has been the director of the festival since 2003.

History 
FILMFEST HAMBURG had various predecessors dating from the 1950s through to the 1980s. It was founded in late 1991 and first held in 1992. Academy Award winners and nominees such as Clint Eastwood, Jodie Foster, Christoph Waltz, Atom Egoyan, Julian Schnabel and Tilda Swinton, Dogma-founder Lars von Trier, award-winning director Kim Ki-duk and German directors such as Wim Wenders, Fatih Akin, Andreas Dresen and Tom Tykwer attended the festival in the past.

Festival program 
The program of FILMFEST HAMBURG is composed of the following permanent sections:

Veto! – This section covers politically motivated film issues which are also awarded at the festival.
Voilà! – comprises films from French speaking countries.
Vitrina – comprises films from Spanish- and Portuguese-speaking countries.
Asia Express – showcases films from all parts of Asia.
Transatlantic – shows contemporary English language-based North American cinema.
Kaleidoskop – is an overview of world cinema.
Hamburger Filmschau – dedicated to films by Hamburg-based filmmakers. 
Große Freiheit – new German cinema.
Televisionen – shows German TV productions on the big screen.
MICHEL Kinder und Jugend Filmfest – is the section for children and adolescents.

Awards

Douglas Sirk Award 

This award is presented annually since 1995 to a personality who has made outstanding achievements within film culture and film industry. It receives its name from director Douglas Sirk, born in Hamburg as Detlef Sierck.

 1995: Clint Eastwood
 1996: Stephen Frears
 1997: Jodie Foster
 1998: Peter Weir
 1999: Jim Jarmusch
 2000: Wong Kar-wai
 2001: Majid Majidi
 2002: Aki Kaurismäki
 2003: Isabelle Huppert
 2004: François Ozon
 2005: Zentropa
 2006: Gérard Depardieu
 2007: David Cronenberg
 2008: Atom Egoyan
 2009: –
 2010: Julian Schnabel
 2011: Andreas Dresen and Peter Rommel
 2012: Kim Ki-duk
 2013: Tilda Swinton
 2014: Fatih Akin
 2015: Catherine Deneuve
 2016: –
 2017: Wim Wenders
 2018: Jafar Panahi
 2019: Nina Hoss
2020: –
2021: Leos Carax

Hamburg Producers Award for German Cinema Productions 

The Hamburg Producers Award for German Cinema Productions has been awarded in the new section Große Freiheit – Filme aus Deutschland since 2018. The producer of the winning film will receive 25,000 euros. The prize money will be provided by the Ministry of Culture and Media.

 2018: Das schönste Paar, Producers: Jamila Wenske and Sol Bondy, Director: Sven Taddicken
 2019: Pelican Blood, Producer: Verena Gräfe-Höft (Junafilm), Directed by: Katrin Gebbe
 2021: Niemand ist bei den Kälbern, Producer: Jonas Weydemann, Jakob Weydemann (Weydemann Bros.), Hamburg, Directed by: Sabrina Sarabi

Hamburg Producers Award for European Cinema Co-Productions 

The Hamburg Producers Award for European Cinema Co-Productions will be awarded to the films in the section Freihafen (Free Port) which will feature German-European co-productions
 2014: "Lost in Karastan", German producers: Daniel Zuta, Brandstorm Entertainment AG; Georgian Co-Producer: Vladimer Katcharava, 20 Steps Production
 2015: "One Floor Below", German producers: Christine Haupt and Alexander Ris, Neue Mediopolis Filmproduktion GmbH; Romanian Co-Producer: Dragos Vilcu, Multi Media Est
 2016: "Scarred Hearts", German producers: Maren Ade, Jonas Dornbach, Janine Jackowski, Komplizen Film; Romanian Co-Producer: Hi Film Productions
 2017: "Arrhythmia", German producers: Eva Blondiau, Color of May; Russian Co-Producers: CTB Film Company, Mars Media Entertainment; Finnish Co-Producers: Don Films, Post Control
 2018: Sibel German Co-Producer: Michael Eckelt (Riva Film, Hamburg) / Cinema-Grading: Les Films du Tambour, Paris
 2019: You Will Die at Twenty (Sudan, Egypt, Norway, France, Germany); Producer: Michael Henrichs (Die Gesellschaft DGS, Cologne), Directed by: Amjad Abu Alala
 2021: Lingui (France, Chad, Germany, Belgium); German co-producer Melanie Andernach (Made in Germany Filmproduktion) / Cinema grading: pilifilms, Paris, Directed by: Mahamat-Saleh Haroun

Hamburg Producers Award for German Television Productions (formerly: TV Producers' Award) 

This award for German TV productions is endowed with €25.000  provided by VFF, Verwertungsgesellschaft der Film- und Fernsehproduzenten mbH.
 2006: BurkertBareiss (Producer: Gloria Burkert and Andreas Bareiss) for "Ich wollte nicht töten", Germany. Directed by: Dagmar Hirtz
 2007: magnolia Filmproduktion (Producer: Babette Schröder) for "Kuckuckszeit", Germany. Directed by: Johannes Fabrick
 2008: Bavaria Fernsehproduktion (Producer: Astrid Kahmke) for "Machen wir's auf Finnisch", Germany. Directed by Marco Petry
 2009: Bremedia Filmproduktion GmbH (Producer: Claudia Schröder) for "Mörder auf Amrum", Germany. Directed by: Markus Imboden
 2010: Wüste Film (Producer: Ralph Schwingel / Stefan Schubert) for "Etwas Besseres als den Tod", Germany. Directed by: Nicole Weegmann
 2011: d.i.e. film GmbH (Producer: Ulrich Aselmann) for "Tödlicher Rausch", Germany. Directed by: Johannes Fabrick
 2012: Aspekt Telefilm-Produktion GmbH (Producer: Claudia Schröder) for "Mörderische Jagd", Germany. Directed by: Markus Imboden
 2013: –
 2014: filmpool fiction (Producer: Iris Kiefer) for "Polizeiruf 110: Familiensache", Germany. Directed by: Eoin Moore
 2015: Calypso Entertainment GmbH (Producer: Brit Possardt) for "Frauen", Germany. Directed by Jan Ruzicka
 2016: –
 2017: Polyphon Film- und Fernsehgesellschaft (Producers: Hubertus Meyer-Burckhardt and Christoph Bicker) for "Meine fremde Freundin", Germany. Directed by: Stefan Krohmer
 2018: Relevant Film GmbH Hamburg (Producer: Heike Wiehle-Timm) for "Aufbruch in die Freiheit", Germany. Directed by: Isabel Kleefeld
 2019: Sutor Kolonko, Cologne, Producer: Ingmar Trost for Das freiwillige Jahr, Directed by:  and Henner Winckler
 2021: Fandango Film, Producer: Jürgen Schuster for Schlaflos in Portugal, Directed by: Florian Froschmayer

Critics' Choice Award 

 2004: "Brothers", Denmark. Directed by: Susanne Bier
 2005: "Iron Island", Iran. Written and directed by: Mohammad Rasoulof
 2007: "Control", Netherlands. Directed by: Anton Corbijn
 2008: "Frozen River", USA. Written and directed by: Courtney Hunt
 2009: "Cold Souls", USA. Written and directed by: Sophie Barthes
 2010: "Pulsar", Belgium. Directed by: Alex Stockmann
 2011: "Take Shelter", USA. Directed by: Jeff Nichols
 2012: "Lore", Germany/Australia/Great Britain. Written and directed by: Cate Shortland
 2013: "Metro Manila", Great Britain/Philippines. Written and directed by: Sean Ellis
 2014: "Hope, France. Written and directed by: Boris Lojkine
 2015: "Neon Bull", Brazil/Uruguay/Netherlands. Written and directed by Gabriel Mascaro
 2016: "Graduation", Romania. Directed by Cristian Mungiu
 2017: "The Florida Project", USA. Directed by: Sean Baker
 2018: "Our Struggles", Belgium. Directed by: Guillaume Senez
 2019: Dwelling in the Fuchun Mountains China. Directed by: Gu Xiaogang
 2021: Vortex, France. Directed by: Gaspar Noé

The Political Film of the Friedrich-Ebert-Stiftung 

The Friedrich-Ebert-Stiftung is awarding this prize at FILMFEST HAMBURG for the first time in 2013. Films aspiring to provide a political message are competing for the prize money of 5,000 euros. 
 2013: "Fire in the Blood", India. Written and directed by: Dylan Mohan Gray
 2013: "Manuscripts Don't Burn", Iran. Written and directed by: Mohammad Rasoulof
 2014: "Children 404", Russia. Directed by: Askold Kurov and Pavel Loparev
 2015: "Every Face Has a Name". Directed by: Magnus Gertten
 2016: "Tadmor", France/Lebanon. Directed by: Monika Borgmann and Lokman Slim
 2017: "The Wait", Denmark. Directed by: Emil Langballe
 2018: "On Her Shoulders", USA. Directed by: Alexandria Bombach
 2019: "Bewegungen eines nahen Bergs", Austria, France. Directed by: Sebastian Brameshuber
 2021: "La Civil", Belgium, Romania, Mexico. Directed by: Teodora Ana Mihai
 2022: "How to Blow Up a Pipeline", USA. A Film by: "Daniel Goldhaber", "Ariela Barer", Jordan Sjol, Daniel Garber

Art Cinema Award 

The Art Cinema Award was established by the Conféderation Internationale des Cinémas d'Art et d'Essai (CICAE). Films that have a German distributor can be nominated. Filmförderung Hamburg Schleswig-Holstein is contributing €5,000  to the award in support of PR measures by the German distributor.
 2008: "35 Rum", France/Germany. Written and directed by: Claire Denis
 2009: "Soul Kitchen", Germany. Written and directed by: Fatih Akin
 2010: "Nowhere Boy", Great Britain/Canada. Directed by: Sam Taylor-Wood
 2011: "Monsieur Lazhar", Canada. Written and directed by: Philippe Falardeau
 2012: "Laurence Anyways", Canada. Written and directed by: Xavier Dolan
 2013: "Venus in Fur", France/Poland. Written and directed by: Roman Polanski
 2014: "Gett: The Trial of Viviane Amsalem", Israel/France/Germany. Written and directed by: Ronit Elkabetz and Shlomi Elkabetz
 2015: "Mustang", France/Turkey/Germany. Directed by: Deniz Gamze Ergüven
 2016: "It's Only the End of the World", Canada/France. Directed by: Xavier Dolan
 2017: "The Rider", USA. Directed by: Chloé Zhao
 2018: "Woman at War", Iceland. Directed by: Benedikt Erlingsson
 2019: 'Portrait of a Lady on Fire' France. Directed by: Céline Sciamma
 2021: 'Paris, 13th District', France. Directed by: Jacques Audiard

NDR Young Talent Award 

In 2012 the NDR (Norddeutscher Rundfunk) sponsored the NDR Young Talent Award with a prize money of €5,000 .
 2008: "Johnny Mad Dog", France. Written and directed by: Jean-Stéphane Sauvaire
 2009: "Before my Eyes", Turkey. Written and directed by: Miraz Bezar
 2010: "Oldboys", Denmark. Written and directed by: Nikolaj Steen
 2011: "Avé", Bulgaria. Written and directed by: Konstantin Bojanov
 2012: "Germania", Argentina. Written and directed by: Maximiliano Schonfeld
 2013: "Short Term 12", USA. Written and directed by: Destin Cretton
 2014: "Mary is Happy, Mary is Happy, Thailand. Written and directed by: Nawapol Thamrongrattanarit
 2015: "Keeper", Belgium/France/Switzerland. Directed by: Guillaume Senez
 2016: "Cold of Kalandar", Turkey. Directed by: Mustafa Kara
 2017: "Beach Rats", USA. Directed by: Eliza Hittman
 2018: "Little Tickles", France. Directed by: Andréa Bescond, Eric Métayer
 2019: 'A Son', Tunisia, France. Directed by: Mehdi M. Barsaoui
 2021: 'Hive', Kosovo, Switzerland, Albania, North Macedonia. Directed by: Blerta Basholli

Commerzbank Audience Award 

The audience gets to decide by public vote which of the competing films in the Eurovisuell section is their favorite and receives a prize money of €5,000, donated by the Commerzbank.
 2004: "Dog Nail Clipper", Finland. Written and directed by: Markku Pölönen
 2005: "Adams Äpfel", Denmark. Written and directed by: Anders Thomas Jensen
 2008: "Willkommen bei den Sch'tis", France. Written and directed by: Dany Boon
 2009: "Meet the Elisabeths", France. Directed by: Lucien Jean-Baptiste
 2010: "Oldboys", Denmark. Written and directed by: Nikolaj Steen
 2011: "King of Devil's Island", Norway. Directed by: Marius Holst
 2012: "This Life", Denmark. Directed by: Anne-Grethe Bjarup Riis
 2013: "The Brats", France. Written and directed by: Anthony Marciano
 2014: "Hallåhallå", Sweden. Written and directed by: Maria Blom
 2015: "Nice People", Sweden. Directed by: Karin af Klintberg and Anders Helgeson
 2016: "The Day Will Come," Denmark. Directed by Jesper W. Nielsen
 2017: "It's for Your Own Good", Spain. Directed by: Carlos Therón
 2018: "Solsidan", Sweden. Directed by: Felix Herngren, Måns Herngren
 2019: 'Psychobitch', Norway. Directed by: Martin Lund
 2021: 'Little Palestine, Diary of a Siege', Lebanon, France, Qatar. Directed by: Abdallah Al-Khatib

MICHEL Award presented by MICHEL Kinder und Jugend Filmfest (part of FILMFEST HAMBURG) 

The Hamburgische Kulturstiftung and the Rolner Stiftung fund this award since 2013 with prize money of €5,000 . A jury made up of children selects the children's and youth films for this international competition.
 2003: Das geheimnisvolle Fräulein C., Canada. Directed by: Richard Ciupka
 2004: Station 4, Spain. Directed by: Antonio Mercero
 2005: , Germany. Written and directed by: Christian Zübert
 2006: Don, Netherlands. Written and directed by: Arend Steenbergen
 2007: Rot wie der Himmel, Italy. Directed by: Cristiano Bortone
 2008: Hey Hey, hier Esther Blueburger, Australia. Written and directed by: Cathy Randall
 2009: Glowing Stars, Sweden. Directed by: Lisa Siewe
 2010: Spork, USA. Directed by: J.B. Ghuman Jr.
 2011: Ways to Live Forever, Great Britain/Spain. Written and directed by: Gustavo Ron
 2012: Stay!, Netherlands. Directed by: Lourens Blok
 2013: Felix, South Africa. Directed by: Roberta Durrant
 2014: The Contest, Denmark. Directed by: Martin Miehe-Renard
 2015: Little Gangster, Netherlands. Directed by: Arne Toonen
 2016: Fanny's Journey, France/Belgium. Directed by: Lola Doillon
 2017: 1:54, Canada. Directed by: Yan England
 2018: Supa Modo, Kenya. Directed by: Likarion Wainaina
 2019: Psychobitch (Norway), Directed by: Martin Lund
 2021: 'The Ape Star', Sweden, Norway, Denmark. Directed by: Linda Hambäck

Sichtwechsel Film Award
Since 2017, the German Foreign Office honors directors who create films across national and cultural borders with a prize money of €10,000 .
 2017: "The Future Perfect", Germany/Argentina. Directed by: Nele Wohlatz.
 2017: "Amin", France. Directed by: Philippe Faucon
 2019: Dark Suns, Directed by: Julien Élie
 2021: 'Olga', Switzerland. Directed by: Elie Grappe

Former Awards

Montblanc Script Award 

Endowed with €10.000  sponsored by Hamburg-based company Montblanc. The award is granted as part of the "Northern Lights" section to a fiction or documentary film either produced or set in Hamburg or Schleswig-Holstein.
 2007: Jan Hinrik Drevs  for "Underdogs", Germany
 2008: Srdjan Vuletic  for "It's Hard to be Nice", Bosnia-Herzegovina/Germany
 2009: Xiaolu Guo for "She, a Chinese", Great Britain/China/France/Germany
 2010: Henrik Peschel for "Pete the Heat", Germany
 2011: Marnie Blok for "Simon and the Oaks", Germany
 2012: Kim Fupz Aakeson for "Mercy", Germany/Netherlands
 2013: Katrin Gebbe for "Nothing Bad Can Happen", Germany

Foreign Press Award 

 2010: "Beyond", Sweden. Direction: Pernilla August
 2011: "The Art of Love", France. Direction: Emmanuel Mouret
 2012: "God's Neighbors", Israel. Direction and screenplay: Meni Yaesh

References

External links 

 Homepage FILMFEST HAMBURG 

Film festivals in Germany
Filmfest
Filmfest
Film festivals established in 1992
1992 establishments in Germany